A lunch box is a container meant to store a meal for consumption.

Lunch box may also refer to:
 "Lunchbox" (song), by Marilyn Manson
 Lunch Box (film), a 2004 Japanese pink film
 "Lunch Box/Odd Sox", 1975 song by Wings
 The Lunch Box, a Thai chamber opera
 The Lunchbox, a 2013 Indian romance
 "Lunchbox", a political term in the United States referring to blue-collar voters, as in Lunch pail Democrat